The 2018 Baylor Bears football team represented Baylor University in the 2018 NCAA Division I FBS football season. The Bears played their home games at the McLane Stadium in Waco, Texas.  They competed as a member of the Big 12 Conference and were led by second-year head coach Matt Rhule. The team improved on its 1–11 record from last season, as they would finish 7–6, 4–5 in Big 12 play to finish in a tie for 5th place. They were invited to the Texas Bowl, where they defeated Vanderbilt.

Previous season
The Bears finished the 2017 season 1–11, 1–8 in Big 12 play to finish in ninth place.

Preseason

Award watch lists
Listed in the order that they were released

Big 12 media poll
The Big 12 media poll was released on July 12, 2018 with the Bears predicted to finish in ninth place.

Schedule
Baylor announced its football schedule on October 26, 2017. They will play 12 games with 6 games at home, 3 among non-conference and 3 Big 12 teams, and 6 away games, against 1 non-conference opponents and 5 Big 12 teams in the 2018 Big 12 Conference football season.

Schedule Source:

Game summaries

Abilene Christian

at UTSA

Duke

Kansas

at Oklahoma

Kansas State

Baylor held a slight edge in the pregame analysis.  Coming into the game Baylor was considered better than they were at this same time last year and has won 3 games (Kansas, Texas-San Antonio, and Abilene Christian), the Bears have also lost 2 (Duke, Oklahoma).  In Baylor's previous game against Oklahoma, they achieved 493 yards of offense in their loss—something expected to be a challenge for Kansas State on defense.

The game started with Kansas State holding the lead at the end of the first and second quarters.  Baylor pulled ahead in the third quarter but missed several field goals.  Baylor's Charlie Brewer threw for 296 yards and Kansas State's Alex Barnes rushed for 250 yards (he ran for 129 yards and four touchdowns in the 2016 matchup also at Baylor).

Kansas State had its share of mistakes:  K-State missed a field goal and an extra point and were also ineffective on kickoff returns.  Kansas State also gave up a fumble on the kickoff return after a controversial play review to start the third quarter and Baylor scored a touchdown two plays later.  Wildcat turnovers and penalties led to three touchdowns for Baylor.  They also had problems with a punt return they recovered and an extra point was blocked.

Baylor's Connor Martin had a rough day as the kicker, missing three field goals and an extra point, yet among all that he ended up kicking the game-winning field goal from 29 yards with 8 seconds left in the game.  The final score was a Baylor victory, 37-34.

at Texas

at West Virginia

Oklahoma State

at Iowa State

TCU

vs Texas Tech

vs Vanderbilt–Texas Bowl

Players drafted into the NFL

References

Baylor
Baylor Bears football seasons
Texas Bowl champion seasons
Baylor Bears football